Lori Lite (born 1961) is an American author and founder of Stress Free Kids, working in the field of children's stress management. Lori has authored 11 books and a curriculum. She wrote and produced 9 Indigo Dreams CDs which encompass relaxation music for children, audio books for children, and guided instructional stress management for teens and adults. Her books have been translated into Japanese, Spanish, and Turkish.

Works published

Books in English  
 Angry Octopus: A Relaxation Story (2008)  
 Angry Octopus Coloring Book (2017)   
 Sea Otter Cove (2008)   
 Affirmation Weaver (2008)   
 Bubble Riding (2008)   
 The Goodnight Caterpillar (2004)  
 A Boy and a Turtle (2012)  
 A Boy and a Bear (1996)   
 The Affirmation Web (1997)   
 Stress Free Kids Parent Guide (2013)   
 Stress Free Kids Curriculum (2011)   
 'Stress Free Kids Bilingual Kit  Books in Spanish 
 El Pulpo Enojado (2012)  Caleta de Nutria Marina (2012)  Tejedor de Afimaciones (2012)  Montando Burbujas (2011)  Buenas Noches Oruga (2011)  El Niño y la Tortuga (2012)  CDs 
 Indigo Dreams  
 Indigo Ocean Dreams  
 Sueños del Océano Índigo  
 Indigo Dreams: Garden of Wellness  
 Indigo Dreams 3-CD set  
 Indigo Teen Dreams   
 Indigo Teen Dreams 2-CD Set  Indigo Dreams: Adult Relaxation  Indigo Dreams: Kids Relaxation Music  
 Indigo Dreams: Teen Relaxation Music  
 Indigo Dreams: Kids Rainforest Relaxation Music ''

References

External links

 Official website

Living people
State University of New York at Oneonta alumni
1961 births
American children's writers
Parapsychologists
People from Twin Falls, Idaho
Writers from Idaho
American adoptees
American women children's writers
American columnists
20th-century American women writers
20th-century American writers
21st-century American women writers
American women columnists